Prawdzic (Prawdzik) - was historically a Polish Coat of Arms. It was used by the nobility clans and later szlachta families in the times of the Kingdom of Poland (1385–1569) and  Polish–Lithuanian Commonwealth.

History

Motto 
The motto of the Prawdzic  coat of arms was Non sibi and Non sibi sed patriae, which is Latin for  "not for self", and "not for self, but for country".

Blazon

Notable bearers
Notable bearers of this Coat of Arms include:
 Krzysztof Arciszewski - Polish artillery commander, officer and engineer, vice-governor of Dutch Brazil and head chief of Dutch military forces there
 Samuel Łaszcz - nobleman, famous soldier and infamous troublemaker during first half of the 17th century  
 Antoni Patek - Polish pioneer in watchmaking and a creator of Patek Philippe & Co. one of the most famous watchmaker companies.
 Felix Kryski - Palantine Duke and Chancellor of Poland.
 Malgorzata Kryska - 
 Tadeusz Thullie - last secretary of King Stanisław August Poniatowski

External links 
  Prawdzic, Prawdzic 2nd Coats of Arms, another variant and bearers

See also 
 Polish heraldry
 Heraldry
 Coat of Arms
 List of Polish nobility coats of arms

Bibliography
Tadeusz Gajl: Herbarz polski od średniowiecza do XX wieku : ponad 4500 herbów szlacheckich 37 tysięcy nazwisk 55 tysięcy rodów. L&L, 2007, ss. 406-539. .

Sources 
 Dynastic Genealogy 
 Ornatowski.com

References

Polish coats of arms